Clara Barberi (born 19 April 1992) is an Argentinian field hockey player.

References

Living people
1992 births
Argentine female field hockey players
Field hockey players from Buenos Aires
Competitors at the 2022 South American Games
South American Games silver medalists for Argentina
South American Games medalists in field hockey
20th-century Argentine women
21st-century Argentine women